Nick Van Eede (born Nicholas Eede, 14 June 1958) is an English singer, songwriter and producer. He is best known for singing and writing the 1986 No. 1 power ballad, "(I Just) Died in Your Arms" for his band Cutting Crew, which saw international success including a top 10 placing on the UK Singles Chart.

Career

1978–1981 
While working as a hospital orderly in the late 1970s, Van Eede was discovered playing by ex-member of the Animals, Chas Chandler, who sent him on a tour of Poland as support for Slade. Van Eede was only 18 when sent on the road. He recalls, "I went with a kazoo and an acoustic guitar and opened for Slade in amphitheatres in front of 18,000 people. I went down as a storm and had the loudest kazoo in Europe, because Slade took their own PA on the road!" His career continued with tours supporting headliners like David Essex, Hot Chocolate and Alan Price.

During that time, Van Eede released five solo singles on Barn Records between 1978 and 1980, but none of them charted on the UK Singles Chart. The first three were "Rock 'n' Roll Fool" b/w "Ounce of Sense", "All or Nothing" b/w "Hold on to Your Heart" and "I Only Want to Be Number One" b/w "Dicing".

The Drivers (1981–1983) 
Van Eede formed the Drivers with friends Mac Norman and Steve Boorer. In the early 1980s, they signed with a record label in Canada. They had a couple of hits there with "Tears on Your Anorak" and "Talk All Night", plus an album, Short Cuts. They had a support band called Fast Forward, whose line up included guitarist Kevin MacMichael. Van Eede was so impressed with MacMichael's guitar playing that the former asked MacMichael to form a new band with him; however, MacMichael could not commit at that time. After a final single release with "Things", a Bobby Darin cover, the Drivers split in 1983.

Cutting Crew (1985–1992) 
Whilst Kevin MacMichael was with Fast Forward, the band was involved in a car crash which left all of the members except MacMichael unable to continue touring. Ready to begin working with Van Eede, MacMichael moved from Toronto to London, where the two of them gave themselves one year to sign a recording contract.  They recruited drummer Martin "Frosty" Beedle, previously a member of the cabaret band on the QE2, and bass player Colin Farley, a session musician living in Spain. Van Eede came up with the band's name after reading an article in the British rock magazine Sounds, which described the band Queen as a "cutting crew", meaning a band that does not play concerts and instead stays in the studio recording new songs.

In 1985, Cutting Crew staged a showcase at a London recording studio for representatives from numerous record labels, and signed a recording contract with Siren Records, part of Virgin Records.

The first single to be released by the band was "(I Just) Died in Your Arms" b/w "For the Longest Time", released in the UK in August 1986. After an appearance on the BBC Television show Top of the Pops, with the song being regularly played on the radio and its music video shown on TV, the single shot up to number 4 in the UK Singles Chart and in May 1987 was number 1 in America for two weeks (Virgin's first number one single in America). In total, the song went to No. 1 in nineteen countries. This would be their biggest hit single. Van Eede came up with the title and concept for "(I Just) Died in Your Arms" after making love with his then-girlfriend. "I actually remember saying that," he admitted, and promptly jotted a note on a pad he always kept close at hand.

The next single, "I've Been in Love Before" b/w "Life in a Dangerous Time" failed to break the UK in its first release in November 1986 but was quickly released again to reach No. 50 in the charts. The album Broadcast was released shortly, which reached 41 on the UK Albums Chart.

Genesis audition (1996) 
After Cutting Crew's demise, Van Eede went on to write and produce for other artists, including producing the original demo of Cher's hit "Believe". In 1996, he auditioned for the job as the new lead singer of Genesis following Phil Collins's departure, in a process where Kevin Gilbert, future Big Big Train vocalist David Longdon, former It Bites singer Francis Dunnery and former Stiltskin singer Ray Wilson were also seriously considered for the role; which ultimately went to Wilson.

2000s
On the 2001 Marillion album Anoraknophobia, Van Eede is credited with co-writing the lyrics to the song "Map of the World" with Marillion frontman Steve Hogarth.

A new album originally titled Grinning Souls was released by Cutting Crew in 2005. Van Eede also appeared on the ITV show Hit Me Baby One More Time, on which he performed "(I Just) Died in Your Arms" and a cover version of Macy Gray's hit "I Try". He then embarked on tour with his new line-up: Gareth Moulton (guitar), Sam Flynn (keyboards), Dominic Finley (bass) and Tom Arnold (drums). They toured the UK (which included the 'Here & Now 2008 Tour'), Germany, Trinidad and the United States.

Recent work
In 2015, a new album was released, Add to Favourites. Joining Van Eede on the album included guitarists Gareth Moulton and Joolz Dunkley, bassist Nick Kay, keyboardist Jono Harrison, drummer Martyn Baker and the Blackjack Horns. Throughout 2015–2017, the band toured South America, the U.S., Australasia and Europe.

In 2020, Van Eede received a BMI (Broadcast Music Inc) award for 5 million plays on US radio for "(I Just) Died in Your Arms". The track was also used in the hit film The Lego Batman Movie and in a season 3 episode of the Netflix series Stranger Things.

Other projects
Since 2008, Van Eede has been a member of supergroup Man Doki Soulmates, formed by Hungarian musician Leslie Mándoki.
Alongside Van Eede, the band's members in the group have included, amongst others: Randy Brecker, Bill Evans, John Helliwell, Chris Thompson, Bobby Kimball, Ian Anderson, Chaka Khan, Tony Carey and the late Jack Bruce and Greg Lake.

Personal life
Van Eede married Nikki McFarlane in June 1996. He has a daughter, Lauren (born 13 May 1986), with ex-partner Andrea Hodder.

References

External links 
BMI entry for Van Eede
 
 
 

1958 births
Living people
English male singer-songwriters
English pop rock singers
English songwriters
English record producers
People from East Grinstead
British male songwriters